In Austria, the Ministry of the Interior (colloquially Innenministerium, abbreviated: BMI) is a federal government agency serving as the interior ministry of the Austrian government. It is chiefly responsible for the public security, but also deals with matters relating to citizenship, elections, referendums, plebiscites and the alternative civilian service. The Ministry of the Interior is considered one of the most important ministries in Austria

It operates and oversees the vast majority of the country's law enforcement agencies, including the Federal Police, the Criminal Police Office (BKA), the Directorate State Protection and Intelligence Service (DSN), the Bureau for Anticorruption (BAK), the Cobra Mission Command (EKO Cobra), the Aerial Police Force, and the Special Observatory Unit (SEO). The Directorate General for the Public Security, which is primarily made up of career law enforcement officers, serves as the professional governing body of all these agencies, except for the BAK. Federal law enforcement agencies outside of the ministry's control include the Military Police, the Fiscal Police, and the Judiciary Guard. 

The Palais Modena is the ministry's central headquarters, it is situated in the centre of Austria's capital Vienna.

History
The Ministry was originally created as "Imperial and Royal Ministry of the Interior", serving as the empire-wide interior ministry for Austria-Hungary. It was succeeded by the "state office of the Interior" (Staatsamt des Innern) of the First Republic in 1918, and later renamed into "Federal Ministry of the Interior". After the dissolution of Nazi Germany in 1945 the Ministry was reestablished into its current form.

Until 1848 internal affairs of the country was under the responsibility of the Austro-Bohemian Court Chancellery which was established by Empress Maria Theresia. In 1848 the ministry was established with the name of the Ministry of the Interior. Between 1918 and 1920 it was called State Office of the Interior. Then it was merged with the ministry of education and was renamed as State Office and Federal Ministry of the Interior and of Education. The body was integrated into the federal government in 1923. Following World War II it was renamed into its current title, Federal Ministry of the Interior.

Responsibilities
The federal agency is charged with the matters of public security, citizenship and civil status including legal names, elections, referendums and popular petitions as well as emergency management and the alternative civilian service.

As superior of the Directorate General for Public Security, the Minister for the Interior is in charge of the Federal Police, the Directorate State Protection and Intelligence Service, the EKO Cobra tactical unit as well as of the Federal Criminal Police Office. Beyond the jurisdiction of the Federal Chancellery, the Ministry is also responsible for the matters of the Austrian states and municipalities, foundations and sovereign wealth funds.

Organization 
The ministry consists of the minister of the interior and the general secretary, under whom there are four sections: the Central Administration, the Directorate General for the Public Security, Legal Affairs, IT and Services and Migration and International Affairs..

Its head and chief executive authority is the Minister of the Interior (Bundesminister), currently Gerhard Karner. Next in rank is the General secretary (Generalsekretär), currently Helmut Tomac, who serves as the agency's head of operations and second-highest-ranking official.

See also

 List of Austrian Ministers of the Interior
 List of Austrian Ministers of Foreign Affairs
 Directorate General for the Public Security
 Federal Police
 Federal Criminal Office
 History of Austria
 Minister of Defense (Austria)
 Ministry of Finance (Austria)
 Ministry of Foreign Affairs (Austria)
 Politics of Austria
 Chancellor of Austria
 President of Austria

References

External links

 (in German)

1848 establishments in the Austrian Empire
Austria, Interior
Austria
Interior